C. K. Sadasivan (born 17 February 1953) is an Indian politician and former member of the Kerala Legislative Assembly. He belongs to the Communist Party of India (Marxist). He was elected to the Kerala Legislative Assembly in 1991, 1996 and 2006.

References

Members of the Kerala Legislative Assembly
Communist Party of India (Marxist) politicians from Kerala
Living people
1953 births
People from Alappuzha district
21st-century Indian politicians